Wilderness is a natural environment on Earth that has not been modified by human action.

Wilderness may also refer to:

Film and television
Wilderness (2006 film), a horror movie filmed in Northern Ireland
Wilderness (2017 film), a Japanese two-part drama film by Yoshiyuki Kishi
Wilderness (1996 TV series), a 1996 British drama directed by Ben Bolt
Wilderness (2023 TV series), an upcoming television series

Literature
Wilderness (Parker novel), a 1979 novel by Robert B. Parker
Wilderness (Weller novel), 2012 novel by Lance Weller
Wilderness (Zelazny-Hausman novel), a 1994 novel by Roger Zelazny and Gerald Hausman
"The Wilderness" (short story), a 1952 science fiction short story by Ray Bradbury
Wilderness, a 2007 children's book by Roddy Doyle
Wilderness: The Lost Writings of Jim Morrison (1943–1971), 1998 poetry book by Jim Morrison

Music 
Wilderness (band), a U.S. indie rock band
Wilderness (Brett Anderson album), 2008
Wilderness (Sophie B. Hawkins album), 2004
Wilderness (C. W. McCall album), 1976
Wilderness (The Features album), 2011
Wilderness (Wilderness album), 2005
Wilderness (The Handsome Family album), 2013
Wilderness, 2015 album by Swedish singer Ola Salo 
 The Wilderness (Explosions in the Sky album), 2016
 The Wilderness (Cowboy Junkies album)
"Wilderness", a song by Nick Jonas from 2014's Nick Jonas
"Wilderness", a song by Sleater-Kinney from their album The Woods
"Wilderness", a song by Joy Division from their album Unknown Pleasures
"Wilderness", a song by Bat for Lashes from her album Two Suns

Other media
The Wilderness, a very dangerous region from the MMORPG RuneScape
Wilderness: A Survival Adventure, a computer game released in 1986, developed by Titan Computer Products and published by Electric Transit
Wilderness (manga), a manga by Akihiro Ito

Ships and Boats
USS Wilderness, a former United States Navy steamship and later revenue cutter
Wilderness 38, an American sailboat design
Wilderness 40, an American sailboat design

Places
Wilderness, Western Cape, a small town in South Africa
Wilderness, Missouri, a community in the United States
Battle of the Wilderness, a battle in Virginia during the American Civil War
The Wilderness (Catonsville, Maryland), a home on the U.S. National Register of Historic Places
The Wilderness (Trappe, Maryland), a 1785 home on the U.S. National Register of Historic Places
Wilderness School, a parochial school in Adelaide, South Australia
Wilderness Territory, a resort in Wisconsin Dells, WI

Other uses
Wilderness (garden history), formal garden features, mostly before 1750
IUCN Protected Area Management Categories
National Wilderness Preservation System of the United States (Created by the Wilderness Act of 1964)
Wilderness therapy is a form of intense behavioral modification therapy

See also
The Wilderness (disambiguation)
Wilderland (a fictional location)